The Dalton House is a historic colonial house in Newburyport, Massachusetts.  The -story wood-frame house was built c. 1746, and is one of the best preserved Georgian houses in the city.  It was built by Michael Dalton, a mariner and merchant who settled in Newburyport in 1735.  Dalton's son Tristram was a major local figure during the American Revolutionary War, and was one of the first United States senators from Massachusetts.  As such, the house was visited by a number of luminaries of early American history, including George Washington and the Marquis de Lafayette.  The house was acquired by the Dalton Club, a men's social club, in 1898.

The house was listed on the National Register of Historic Places in 1978, and included in the Newburyport Historic District in 1984.

See also
National Register of Historic Places listings in Essex County, Massachusetts

References

External links

Houses in Newburyport, Massachusetts
Houses on the National Register of Historic Places in Essex County, Massachusetts
Historic district contributing properties in Massachusetts
Houses completed in 1746
Georgian architecture in Massachusetts